Abdullah Saleh Al-Ashtal (1938 – 26 August 2004) was a Yemeni diplomat who was a Permanent Representative at the United Nations in New York City for nearly 30 years.

On 29 May 1973, Al-Ashtal was appointed as the Permanent Representative of South Yemen to the United Nations. In March 1990, he was President of the United Nations Security Council. After South Yemen and North Yemen united on 22 May 1990, Al-Ashtal continued to represent the united Yemen at the UN. He was again President of the Security Council in December 1990. Al-Ashtal was Yemen's ambassador to the UN until July 2002.

After his death, Yemeni government officials stated that they had repeatedly offered Al-Ashtal a senior position within the government, including that of Foreign Minister, but that he had always declined and preferred to remain at the United Nations. He died of lung cancer in New York City.

References
"Al-Ashtal, former ambassador to UN dies", Yemen Times, 5 May 2004

External links

1938 births
2004 deaths
Deaths from lung cancer in New York (state)
Permanent Representatives of South Yemen to the United Nations
Permanent Representatives of Yemen to the United Nations
Yemeni diplomats
Yemeni expatriates in the United States